The original Knole Settee (also known as the Knole Sofa) is a couch chair that was made in the 17th century, probably around 1640. It is housed at Knole in Kent, a house owned by the Sackville-West family since 1605 but now in the care of the National Trust.

It was originally used not as a comfortable sofa but as a formal throne on which the monarch would have sat to receive visitors. It was wide enough that a monarch and consort could be seated side by side. , it is kept at Knole House in a transparent case.

Modern versions of the design are marketed as "Knole settees" or "Knole sofas". They feature adjustable side arms and considerable depth of seating, and usually have exposed wooden finials atop the rear corners, and some exposed wood may be present on the arms. The arms, more correctly sides, are of the same height as the back. The side arms are tied to the sofa back by means of heavy decorative braid, often with an elaborate tassel, looped around the finials on the arms and back.

Etymology
The name of the sofa is spelled as "Knole" and not "Knoll", and it has no relation to the furniture company called Knoll. The sofa's name derives from Knole House in Sevenoaks, Kent, which is open to the public and run by the National Trust. On display there is the original Knole Sofa, along with other pieces of matching seat furniture.

In literature
A number of references to the Knole sofa are found in literature; for example, Derek Marlowe notes the usage in his 1968 book Memoirs of a Venus Lackey. In the 1962 novel In High Places, a Knole sofa is positioned in a room with a fine Kerman antique carpet.

References

External links 
 Knole Sofa – National Trust Collections

Couches
History of furniture